John Eric Ensign (born March 25, 1958) is an American veterinarian and former politician who served as a United States Senator from Nevada from 2001 until his resignation in 2011 amid a Senate Ethics Committee investigation into his attempts to hide an extramarital affair. A member of the Republican Party, Ensign previously represented Nevada's 1st congressional district in the House of Representatives from 1995 to 1999. Following his resignation from the Senate, Ensign returned to Nevada and resumed his career as a veterinarian.

Early life, education, and veterinary career 
Ensign was born in 1958 in Roseville, California, to Sharon Lee Cipriani (whose father was Italian) and a father whose surname was Mueller. Ensign's father abandoned the family when Ensign was four years of age; Ensign then moved with Cipriani to Nevada. Cipriani later married Michael S. Ensign, a gaming industry executive; he formally adopted young John, who considers him his "real father." The senior Ensign later became chairman of the board of directors of Mandalay Resort Group,

John Ensign attended the University of Nevada, Las Vegas, becoming a member of the Sigma Chi fraternity. He graduated from Oregon State University with a Bachelor of Science degree in 1981. He received his Doctor of Veterinary Medicine degree from Colorado State University in 1985 and entered veterinary practice soon after. Ensign became a successful businessman, opening a 24-hour animal hospital in Las Vegas. He owned two animal hospitals before entering politics.

In political campaigns, Ensign frequently referred to his ancestry, noting that he is one-eighth (1/8) Filipino. As of 2008, Ensign had never met his Philippine-born paternal grandfather, who is of Filipino-German ancestry. Ensign did not learn of this grandfather's ancestry until about 1994. The Senator was conferred the Order of the Knights of Rizal with the rank of Knight Grand Cross of Rizal by Filipino dignitaries in 1997.

After resigning from the U.S. Senate in 2011, Ensign returned to Las Vegas with his family. Ensign then renewed his practice as a veterinarian and opened Boca Park Animal Hospital.

Political career

U.S. House of Representatives 
In 1994, Ensign won the Republican nomination for Nevada's 1st congressional district, based in Las Vegas. He trailed four-term incumbent Democrat James Bilbray by a wide margin for most of the campaign. However, Ensign gained considerable momentum after reports surfaced that a Bilbray aide stood to make a huge profit from lands legislation sponsored by Bilbray. Ensign won the election by 1,400 votes and was reelected in 1996 by seven points, although Democratic presidential candidate Bill Clinton carried the district by a large margin that year.

U.S. Senate 

In 1998, Ensign ran for the Senate but was defeated by the Democratic incumbent, future Senate Majority Leader Harry Reid, by 428 votes.

Ensign won a Senate seat on his second try in 2000, defeating Democratic opponent Ed Bernstein by a 55%–40% margin, to succeed the retiring Democratic incumbent, Richard H. Bryan. Ensign was reelected in 2006; he defeated businessman Jack Carter.

Ensign and Reid developed a fairly good relationship, despite their bruising 1998 contest. They frequently worked together on Nevada issues.

In April 2009, Ensign was planning a June 1 trip to Iowa, the first in his career, causing speculation that he was mulling a presidential campaign in 2012. Given the disclosure of his extramarital affair and cover-up in mid-June of that year, his presidential aspirations were put in limbo. Ensign resigned his position as chair of the Senate Republican Policy Committee on June 17, 2009, in the wake of a Senate Ethics Committee investigation. On July 14, 2009, Ensign announced his plan to run for re-election to his Nevada Senate seat in 2012, even though his polling numbers had recently decreased.

For Sharron Angle's debate with Harry Reid on October 14, 2010, Ensign played Reid during one day of her debate preparation at the Trump Plaza in Las Vegas. The Las Vegas Sun speculated in November 2010 that this might hurt his relationship with Reid, who could "man up" and oppose Ensign's re-election. The Las Vegas Review-Journal noted in November 2010 that Ensign had multiple "hurdles" to re-election.

Chairmanship of National Republican Senatorial Committee 
Ensign was elected Chairman of the National Republican Senatorial Committee (NRSC). As chairman of the NRSC, Ensign was charged with assembling a staff to win back the U.S. Senate for Republicans in the 2008 elections. Ensign chose Mike Slanker and Lindsey Slanker of Nevada-based political consulting firm November Inc. to be the Political Director and Finance Director of the NRSC. In the 2008 elections, Democrats gained 8 seats, and after the party switch of Arlen Specter in 2009, the Democrats gained a filibuster-proof majority in the Senate.

Electronic fund-raising reports 
In September 2007, it was discovered that Ensign had used the secret hold rule to prevent a bill requiring senators to file fund-raising reports electronically from being voted on. He required that they first vote on his amendment to strengthen disclosure rules. (The "secret hold" is a parliamentary procedure within the Standing Rules of the Senate that allows one or more Senators to prevent a motion from reaching a vote on the Senate floor.) Ensign insisted that, before a vote on the disclosure bill could be held, the committee would first vote on an amendment that "would force groups petitioning the Senate Ethics Committee to disclose the identity of donors giving more than $5,000", which watchdog groups charged was intended to prevent passage of the bill.

2006 re-election campaign 

Ensign faced Democrat Jack Carter, son of former President Jimmy Carter, in the November general election. Both he and Carter defeated token opposition in their August 15, 2006 primaries. Ensign defeated Carter in the general election on November 7, 2006, 55.36% to 40.99%.

Resignation 
On March 7, 2011, Ensign said he would not seek re-election in 2012 because he wanted to spare his family from an "exceptionally ugly" campaign. "At this point in my life, I have to put my family first," Ensign told reporters at a news conference in Las Vegas. The announcement was welcomed by national Republicans, who suggested he would not have survived a primary election. The Senate Ethics Committee conducted a 22-month investigation of Ensign's activities. Before they released their report, on April 21, 2011, Ensign announced his resignation from office effective May 3. He said that he "will not continue to subject my family, my constituents, or the Senate to any further rounds of investigation, depositions, drawn out proceedings, or especially public hearings." The Committee gave its report to the Department of Justice for investigation of alleged serious violations of law.

Ensign became the first United States Senator from Nevada to resign, besides Alan Bible, who resigned seventeen days before the end of his term to give his successor an advantage in seniority.

Senate committee assignments 
 Committee on the Budget
 Committee on Commerce, Science and Transportation
 Subcommittee on Aviation Operations, Safety, and Security
 Subcommittee on Communications, Technology, and the Internet (Ranking Member)
 Subcommittee on Surface Transportation and Merchant Marine Infrastructure, Safety, and Security
 Committee on Finance
 Subcommittee on Health Care
 Subcommittee on Taxation, IRS Oversight, and Long-Term Growth
 Subcommittee on Social Security, Pensions and Family Policy
 Committee on Homeland Security and Governmental Affairs

Political positions

Abortion 
The National Right to Life Committee and NARAL Pro-Choice America certify his anti-abortion voting record. Ensign authored the Child Custody Protection Act in 2003, which prohibits taking minors across State lines to circumvent laws in certain jurisdictions that require parents to be involved in abortion decisions by minors.

Animal advocacy 
Ensign was considered one of the Humane Society's biggest allies in Congress. Along with Senators Maria Cantwell (D-WA), Arlen Specter (D-PA) and Dianne Feinstein (D-CA), Senator Ensign—a veterinarian—was a lead sponsor of the Animal Fighting Prohibition Enforcement Act, which transformed into a felony the transport of animals across state lines for the purpose of fighting. According to a press release from Ensign's office, "Fifty states currently have laws against dog fighting and forty-nine have laws against cockfighting. This bill complements these state laws."

Cuba 
Senator Ensign was a member of the Congressional Cuba Democracy Caucus.

"Don't Ask, Don't Tell" policy 
On December 18, 2010, Ensign voted in favor of the Don't Ask, Don't Tell Repeal Act of 2010 to allow gay and lesbian people to serve openly in the armed forces.

Eminent domain 
Ensign had been a leading voice against the Kelo v. New London Supreme Court ruling, and introduced a bill that would blunt the effects of the ruling. In Kelo, the Court ruled that local governments could use eminent domain not just for public use but for any project that involves a public purpose. Specifically, the Court permitted the City of New London, Connecticut, to force a homeowner to sell her home for new development. The decision that eminent domain could be used to issue a condemnation order on a property for a private purpose caused a backlash.

Fiscal issues 
The conservative fiscal watchdog group Citizens Against Government Waste awarded Ensign a 92% lifetime rating—the fourth highest Senator after Jim DeMint, Tom Coburn and Jon Kyl—as of 2007.

In 2005, Ensign introduced legislation to the Commission on the Accountability and Review of Federal Agencies. The commission would compile a list of what its members consider unnecessary, outdated, wasteful, or duplicative discretionary programs, and require Congress to vote up-or-down to eliminate all programs on the list. The proposal was similar to the process Congress uses for Base Realignment and Closure to assess military bases. It was not passed.

Health care reform 
Ensign opposed President Barack Obama's health reform legislation; he voted against the Patient Protection and Affordable Care Act in December 2009, and he voted against the Health Care and Education Reconciliation Act of 2010.

Marriage 
In 1998, after President Bill Clinton admitted to having committed adultery with Monica Lewinsky, Ensign called on him to resign. Ensign said, "He has no credibility left."

In 2004, Ensign spoke on the Senate floor in favor of the proposed Federal Marriage Amendment, which would have barred states from recognizing same-sex marriage.  Ensign said:

Marriage is the cornerstone on which our society was founded. For those who say that the Constitution is so sacred that we cannot or should not adopt the Federal Marriage Amendment, I would simply point out that marriage, and the sanctity of that institution, predates the American Constitution and the founding of our nation.

Prison reform 
In 2011, Ensign introduced legislation that would have required all low-security prisoners to work 50 hours per week.

Veterans 
In April 2008 Ensign voted against a measure to expand federal benefits to Filipino veterans in the Philippines, then a U.S. Commonwealth, against Japan during World War II. He said he thought benefits should be used for veterans in the United States. The measure passed Congress.

Wars in Afghanistan and Iraq 
Ensign voted in support of authorizing the President to use the United States Armed Forces to "deter and prevent acts of international terrorism against the United States." This is the authorizing legislation for the invasion of Afghanistan and removing the Taliban from power.

Ensign also voted in support of the President to use the United States Armed Forces "as he determines to be necessary and appropriate" in order to "defend the national security of the United States against the continuing threat posed by Iraq; and enforce all relevant United Nations Security Council Resolutions regarding Iraq." Ensign supported the counterinsurgency policy in Iraq in 2007 and opposed withdrawing troops from Iraq in 2007 and 2008.

Personal life 
According to The New York Times, during college at Colorado State, Ensign became a born-again Christian. He and his wife, Darlene, were active in the Promise Keepers, an evangelical group. He and his wife have three children.

Ensign is a member of the Pentecostal International Church of the Foursquare Gospel. During his Senate tenure, he was the only Pentecostal in the Senate.  While working in Washington, DC, he resided at the C Street Center, a religious house in the capital. Ensign moved out of the C Street house in November 2009, after disclosure of an extramarital affair and reports that he influenced others to keep quiet about it.

When in Las Vegas he attends a northwest Foursquare church. He is a member of the religious and political organization The Fellowship, described by evangelical Christians as one of the most politically well-connected fundamentalist organizations in the United States.

Affair and corruption scandal 

Between 2007 and 2008, Senator Ensign had an affair with Cynthia Hampton, who worked for a PAC supporting his campaigns. Her husband, Doug Hampton, was a close friend of Ensign and worked as a top administrative staffer in his Washington, DC office. Sen. Tom Coburn, with Timothy and David Coe, leaders of The Fellowship, attempted to intervene to end Ensign's affair in February 2008 by convincing Ensign to write a letter to Hampton's wife breaking off the affair. Ensign was chaperoned by Coburn and other members from C Street, where Ensign lived with Coburn, to a FedEx office to post the letter. Ensign called Hampton's wife hours later to tell her to ignore the letter and flew out to spend the weekend with her in Nevada.

The disclosure of the affair—together with Ensign's efforts to keep it quiet, including finding work for Doug Hampton as a lobbyist—resulted in investigations by the Federal Bureau of Investigation, the Federal Election Commission, and the Senate. The alleged misconduct included a $96,000 payment from Ensign's parents, which Doug Hampton claimed was an unreported severance payment; Hampton obtaining a job as a lobbyist at Ensign's behest; Ensign helping Hampton in his role as a lobbyist in violation of a one-year lobbying ban on ex-Senate staffers; and Hampton's additional charge that Ensign sexually harassed his wife.

On March 7, 2011, Ensign announced that he would not seek re-election to the Senate the following year because he wished to shield his family from the consequences of his past behavior. In late April 2011, Ensign announced that he would resign his position as Senator on May 3. In May 2011, the Senate Ethics Committee referred its report to the Department of Justice for investigation of possible violations of law. The Department of Justice found evidence of potential criminality but decided against prosecuting Ensign.

Electoral history 

*Write-in and minor candidate notes: In 2000, Independent American candidate Ernie Berghof received 2,540 votes; Citizens First candidate Bill Grutzmacher received 1,579 votes; No Vote Cast received 457 votes; and Over Vote received 69 votes.

** Nevada law since 1975 allows dissatisfied voters to vote for "None of These Candidates."

See also 
 List of federal political sex scandals in the United States
 List of federal political scandals in the United States
 List of Asian Americans and Pacific Islands Americans in the United States Congress
 List of United States senators expelled or censured

References

External links 

Dr. John Ensign official Boca Park Animal Hospital page
 John Ensign for Senate official campaign website
 
 
 Collected news stories, blogs and videos from the Las Vegas Sun
A Guide to the John Ensign U.S. Senatorial Papers, 2013-11 (collection is closed for research until May, 2021), Special Collections, University Libraries, University of Nevada, Reno.

|-

|-

|-

|-

|-

|-

1958 births
21st-century American politicians
American adoptees
American evangelicals
American Pentecostals
American people of Italian descent
American politicians of Filipino descent
American veterinarians
Asian-American members of the United States House of Representatives
Asian-American United States senators
Businesspeople in the casino industry
Colorado State University alumni
Living people
Male veterinarians
Members of the Foursquare Church
Members of the United States Congress of Filipino descent
Oregon State University alumni
People from Roseville, California
Politicians from Sacramento, California
Promise Keepers
Republican Party members of the United States House of Representatives from Nevada
Republican Party United States senators from Nevada
Asian conservatism in the United States